Filippo Amedeo (2 February 1891 – 18 June 1946) was an Italian politician.

Amedeo was born in Turin. He represented the Italian Socialist Party in the Chamber of Deputies from 1921 to 1926 and in the Constituent Assembly of Italy for a short time in 1946.

References
 PARLAMENTO ITALIANO

1891 births
1946 deaths
Politicians from Turin
Italian Socialist Party politicians
Deputies of Legislature XXVI of the Kingdom of Italy
Deputies of Legislature XXVII of the Kingdom of Italy
Members of the National Council (Italy)
Members of the Constituent Assembly of Italy
Politicians of Piedmont
Italian military personnel of World War I
Italian resistance movement members
Italian Aventinian secessionists